The color  is one of the Japanese traditional colors that has been in use since 660 CE in the form of various dyes used in designing kimono.

The name  comes from the Japanese for the colour of a type of kelp tea, but the word was often used as a synonym for a form of flattery in a curious parallel with the English usage brown nosing.

References

See also 
 List of colors

Kobicha